Sam Thompson (born 2 August 1992) is an English reality star and radio host. Since 2013, he has appeared in Made in Chelsea. He is also known for  finishing in third place on Celebrity Big Brother, and been a contestant on Celebrity Coach Trip and several times on Celebs Go Dating. In 2022, he started hosting a Sunday radio show on Hits Radio.

Career
In 2013, he was cast on the E4 reality series Made in Chelsea. Thompson left the show for a time but later returned. In 2017, he was a housemate on Celebrity Big Brother 20. He finished in third behind Sarah Harding and Amelia Lily. In 2018, 2019 and 2020, he appeared on the fourth, sixth and the ninth series for guest appearance on Celebs Go Dating, making Thompson the most frequent cast member on the show. In 2019, Sam was a contestant on the Celebrity Coach Trip 4. He was also on Celebrity SAS: Who Dares Wins, where he was shouted at by Ant Middleton. In 2021, Thompson was on The Celebrity Circle with Pete Wicks and they came second. Thompson also posts regularly on TikTok, partaking in pranks, dances and creates various other videos. In 2022, he began a new career as a radio host hosting a Sunday radio show on Hits Radio. In January 2023, it was announced that Thompson would be a regular panellist on Love Island: Aftersun, alongside Indiyah Polack, as well as the new hosts of the podcast Love Island: The Morning After.

Personal life
Thompson was educated at Bradfield College.  His sister is fellow former Made in Chelsea cast member, Louise Thompson.

Since 2019, Thompson has been in a relationship with Love Island cast member, Zara McDermott.

Television

References

Living people
1992 births
People from Chelsea, London
Participants in British reality television series
English radio personalities
Television personalities from London
Made in Chelsea